The La Naveta Formation (Kiln) is a geological formation of the Altiplano Cundiboyacense, Eastern Ranges of the Colombian Andes. The formation consists of a lower part of coraline limestones and an upper sequence of quartzitic sandstones with intercalated black shales and dates to the Early Cretaceous period; Hauterivian to Barremian epochs.

Etymology 
The formation was first defined as Horizonte de La Naveta by Hubach in 1931 and in 1969 by Cáceres and Etayo elevated to formation.

Description

Lithologies 
The La Naveta Formation is characterised by a lower part of coraline limestone and an upper sequence of quartzitic sandstones with black shales intercalated.

Stratigraphy and depositional environment 
The La Naveta Formation overlies the Útica Formation and is overlain by the Trincheras Formation. The age has been estimated to be Hauterivian to Barremian. Stratigraphically, the formation is time equivalent with the Las Juntas, Ritoque and Paja Formations.

Outcrops 

The La Naveta Formation has its type locality to the north of the Bogotá River.

Regional correlations

See also 

 Geology of the Eastern Hills
 Geology of the Ocetá Páramo
 Geology of the Altiplano Cundiboyacense

References

Bibliography

Maps

External links 
 

Geologic formations of Colombia
Cretaceous Colombia
Lower Cretaceous Series of South America
Barremian Stage
Hauterivian Stage
Sandstone formations
Limestone formations
Shale formations
Shallow marine deposits
Formations
Geography of Cundinamarca Department